Sheikh ‘Uthman Sirâj-ud-Dîn Al-Naqshbandi (Arabic: الشيخ عثمان الطويلي النقشبندي; Turkish: Osman Sirâceddîn Nakşibendi) known as Uthman Siraj-ud-Din at-Tavili or Uthman Siraj-ud-Din al-Awal (b. 1781 AD/c. 1195 AH Tawella, Iraq - d. 1867 AD/c. 1284 AH Tawella, Iraq) was an 18th-century Kurdish sufi, saint and Islamic scholar. He is sayyid and sherif, and was also revindicated as an ancestor of Sayyid Battal Gazi. He belonged to one of the most influential noble households of the Middle East and Ottoman Empire. Uthman Sirâj-ud-Dîn was one of the great sheikhs of his time.

Family lineage 
The family of Uthman Sirâj-ud-Dîn, can be traced back to the 7th century. 

He is Uthman ibn Khâlid ibn Abdullah ibn Sayyid Muhammad ibn Sayyid Darwish ibn Sayyid Mashraf ibn Sayyid Jumu'ah ibn Sayyid Zahir (which is one of the blessed Sayyids), the son of Al-Hussain ibn Ali Ibn Abi Talib. The mother of Sheikh Uthman is Hamilah bint Abu Bakr. Her father’s name indicates that she comes from a family of deep faith in Islam. Abu Bakr's lineage reaches to the jurist Ahmed Ghazai which reaches back to Al-Hassan ibn Ali ibn Abi Talib. The lineage of Sirâj-ud-Dîn links to Prophet Muhammad, his family and his companions.
(The phrase al-Hasani wal-Hussaini affirms his lineal descent from both Hasan ibn Ali and Hussein ibn Ali, the grandsons of Muhammad)

Biography 
Uthman Sirâj-ud-Dîn was born in the village called Tawella in Ottoman Empire known for the loyalty of its people, the smell of their fragrances and cleanness of its water. His life was made up of habitual recitation of the Quran for which he was renowned and exceptional, and memorising the noble Quran and the religious knowledges. He journeyed to the plantation of Khurmal (Iraq) and the Kharabani School which he frequented with students from all directions. He displayed signs of righteousness, virtue, abstinence, and exertion during his lessons.

Thereafter he went to Baghdad by the way of Sulaymaniyah for the religious schools and the safety of the precincts of the Ottoman Empire. He studied various Islamic sciences there in the Madrasa of Abd al-Qadir al-Jilani. Sheikh Uthman Sirâj-ud-Dîn was the most important figure among Mavlana Halid's disciples even while Mevlana Khalid was still living in Baghdad. The two men know each other as students of Islamic sciences, and they met once again in Baghdad in 1811 during Mevlana Khalid's 5-month short stay in the mosque complex of Abd al-Qadir al-Jilani, shortly after his return from India. It was then that Faqīh Uthman, who afterwards was known as Sirâj-ud-Dîn, was initiated to the path by Mawlana. After two years of spiritual training, at the age of 33, he was the first person to become a caliph of Mawlana on the whole. Sheikh Uthman began to seek the designation of jurists by seeking sacred knowledge, this was beloved term given by his spiritual guide Mawlana Khalid-i Baghdâdî.

Mawlana Khalid-i Baghdâdî said:

"I bore separation and calamity then arrived to various ranks, then it was taken from me by Uthman Sirâj-ud-Dîn," and added, "I planted and Uthman sowed."

He moved, instead, to his home region, Tawella, and began to establish a strong base for the order, which became one of the most important centres for the Khalidi suborder in the whole Middle East and continued to be such until the fifties of the present century. This centre not only contributed greatly in spreading the sufi teachings of the Naqshbandi order, but also produced a number of poets whose poems are examples of the most significant and marvellous sufi poetry as a whole.

The usually laconic Haydari writes: 
"He had many dazzling miracles and visible amazing supernatural deeds. The elite and common people testified to his sainthood. He became famous among the people, and many distinguished religious scholars and the most respected virtuous and pious followed the path under his hand. Many Jews and Christians were converted to Islam through his attentionand heed, followed the path in his lodge, and attained mystical states. The condition of this saintwas mostly intoxication and majesty."

His fame spread throughout the Ottoman and Iranian Empires at the time. He had a great number of caliphs, deputies and affiliates from different regions. Sirâj-ud-Dîn was given the  responsibility to guide, be firm and assign his deputies. He became the focus of his seekers and associates. He guided people faithfully for more than 40 years in Tawella and Sulaymaniyah.

Family tree and Silsilah

This is the family tree and Silsila of Tariqa Naqshbandiyya ‘Uthmaniyya

Death 
‘Uthman Sirâj-ud-Dîn passed away on Tuesday night on the 6th of Shawwal in the Islamic year 1283 (1867). He was 88 years old and was buried in a garden next to his house in Tawella, Iraq.

See also
Muhammed Osman Sirajeddin
Sheikhs of Tavil

References 

Ottoman Sufis
Iraqi Sufis
Sufi teachers
Naqshbandi order
Husaynids
19th-century Muslim scholars of Islam
19th-century people from the Ottoman Empire
1781 births
1867 deaths
19th-century Kurdish people